Boot camps are part of the correctional and penal system of some countries. Modeled after military recruit training camps, these programs are based on shock incarceration grounded on military techniques. The aggressive training used has resulted in deaths in a variety of circumstances. Boot camps are also criticized around the world for their lack of behavioral change and for the way extreme force can traumatize children and teenagers.

Background 
The term "boot" originates from US Navy and Marine recruits in the Spanish–American War (1898) who wore leggings called boots. These recruits were trained in "boot" camps.

Military-style training was used in the eighteenth century to rehabilitate civilian prisoners in the United States and for military prisoners during World War 2.

Use around the world

Australia
In Australia the Premier of the state of Queensland Campbell Newman announced that bootcamps for convicted young people will open in Townsville and Rockhampton by September 2013, along with two other camps. These bootcamps closed in 2015.

Canada

In Canada, participation in boot camp programs is voluntary, so as to avoid any challenges under the Canadian Charter of Rights and Freedoms under which treatment at boot camps could be seen as an infringement on a youth's right to not be subject to cruel and unusual punishment and to ensure security of person.

The provincial government of Ontario funded a private boot camp project for non-violent juveniles, Project Turnaround, from 1997 to 2004. The camp was a "tougher" alternative to Ontario's other youth detention facilities as part of a tough on crime response to increasing youth incarceration rates by the government of Premier Mike Harris.

Canadian boot camps do not have the time frame of 90 to 180 days and they are restricted to juveniles under 18, and are not yet open to female offenders. The judges do not directly possess the authority to send a youth to a boot camp. They may impose a sentence of secure or open custody. The latter is defined as, "a community residential center, group home, child care institution or forest or wilderness camp..." Once an open custody sentence is granted, a correctional official decides whether a sentence is served in a boot camp program. But the ultimate decision rests with the young person and the decision is made purely on the merits of the program because the time served remains the same.

The Canadian system is too new to show any comparable results but research has been done among US boot camps with different emphases, e.g. more on drug treatment or education than solely on military drill. According to the findings treatment has a slightly positive impact on the reduction of recidivism over strict discipline.

New Zealand
New Zealand set up its first boot camps in 1971 but they were abandoned in 1981. The boot camps were regarded as a failure with a 71% rate of re-offending among corrective trainees. Prior to being elected into Government in 2008 the National Party released a policy of using boot camps for those with drug problems. The Fifth National Government introduced military-style activity camps (MACs) run by the New Zealand Defence Force for forty of the most serious recidivist young offenders which involved marching exercises, mentoring, drug and alcohol treatment programs, education, and an assisted move back into the community. The Government also launched a nine-week camp for the most serious, recidivist offenders in Christchurch in 2010 and a court-supervised programme providing up to ten days of adventure camp activities. 35 of the 42 participants in the first boot camp intake reoffended while 15 of the 17 participants in the second intake reoffended. While the-then Deputy Prime Minister Paula Bennett claimed the programmes had succeeded in lowering offending among that group, this was disputed by Prime Minister John Key's chief science adviser Sir Peter Gluckman in a 2011 report. The New Zealand Families Commission concluded that military camps and other measures such as curfews with electronic monitoring could not reduce re-offending on their own and that the most successful rehabilitation programmes involved the offenders' families.

On 13 August 2017, Prime Minister Bill English promised to establish a boot camp known as the "Junior Training Academy" for youth offenders at the Waiouru Military Camp during the 2017 election campaign. English clarified that the camp would be for small group of around 150 young offenders who had committed serious offenses including serious assault, sexual assaults, aggravated robbery and murder. In response, youth Justice advocacy group JustSpeak director Katie Bruce criticized the proposed boot camp policy and argued that it would do little to curb re-offending among young offenders. National's proposed policy was criticized by the radio host Mark Sainsbury, The Opportunities Party leader Gareth Morgan, the New Zealand First leader Winston Peters, and the University of Canterbury psychologist and author Jarrod Gilbert, who contended that the policy was aimed at enticing voters rather than helping youth offenders and that previous boot camp programmes had failed. The boot camp policy was also criticized by both National's support partner, the Māori Party, and the opposition Green Party for doing little to address youth offending within the Māori and the Pasifika communities. David Seymour, the leader of National's support partner the ACT Party, criticized the boot camp policy as a sign of the Government's failure to tackle "broken families" and youth crime.

In mid November 2022, National Party leader Christopher Luxon announced that if elected National would establish boot camps known as Youth Offender Military Academies for juvenile offenders aged between 15 and 17 years. These camps would be run by the Ministry of Justice and New Zealand Defence Force and would provided education, counselling, drug and alcohol treatment, and cultural support to offenders. Luxon's proposal was criticised by Prime Minister Jacinda Ardern, the NZ Psychological Society, and youth workers Aaron Hendry and Apiphany Forward Taua, who argued that boot camps failed to address the causes of youth crime. In addition, Gluckman criticised boot camps and other "scared straight" programmes for increasing crime. He advocated addressing juvenile delinquency and abuse through early intervention programmes, targeted mental health services, and complimentary services focusing on the Māori and Pasifika communities. By contrast, former Hamilton City councillor Mark Bunting opined that boot camps could help deal with high youth crime rates in the Waikato region and was preferable to sending youth offenders to prison.

United States
The first boot camps appeared in the states of Georgia and Oklahoma in 1983. Boot camps are intended to be less restrictive than prison but harsher than probation.

In most U.S. states participation in boot camp programs is offered to young first-time offenders in place of a prison term or probation; in some states a youth can also be sentenced to participate in such a program. The time served can range from 90 to 180 days, which can make up for prison sentences of up to 10 years. 
Federal shock incarceration programs are authorized under 18 U.S.C. § 4046, although the placement requires consent of the prisoner.

In 1995, the U.S. federal government and about two-thirds of the 50 states were operating boot camp programs. Presently, there are no statistics as to how many boot camps there are in the U.S. In 2000, there were 51 boot camps still open. In 2010 80% of participants were ethnic minorities.

There are many types of boot camps. Some boot camps are more therapeutic.

State run boot camps were banned in Florida on June 1, 2006 through legislation signed by Florida Governor Jeb Bush after 14-year-old Martin Lee Anderson died while in a boot camp. Anderson died as drill instructors beat him and encouraged him to continue physical exercise after he had collapsed. While Anderson was unconscious, guards placed ammonia tablets near his nose in an attempt to revive him, and he suffocated. Anderson attended Bay County Boot Camp in Panama City, Florida. The Victory Forge Military Academy in Florida has come under intense scrutiny of its methods, which border on physical abuse. The camp's defense is that the parents had signed a contract authorizing the use of physical force against their children.

Evaluation
Studies in the United States suggest that boot camps with a strong therapeutic component (such as education, drug treatment and counselling) have a positive effect on participants, while those that have no counselling and consist only of physical activity have a significant negative effect. A key criticism is that the emphasis on authority can only result in frustration, resentment, anger, short temper, a low self-esteem and aggression rather than respect. Some boot camps have been the subject of abuse scandals. According to The New York Times there were 31 known deaths of youths in U.S. boot camps since between 1980 and 2009, a rate of approximately one death each year.

Alternatives
Boot camps claim to remove children "from environments filled with negative influences and triggering events that produce self-defeating, reckless or self-destructive behavior". Other types of programs (see  outdoor education, adventure therapy, and wilderness therapy) use this method while avoiding all or some of the controversial methods of boot camps, and they claim lower recidivism.

See also
 Behavior modification facility
 Fitness boot camp
 Juvenile court
 Gooning
Rock and a Hard Place, an HBO documentary film about youth boot camps in the U.S.
 Brat Camp
 Borstal

References

Further reading
Begin, P. Boot Camps: Issues for Consideration. (Ottawa: Library of Parliament, September 1996).
"BHIP: Studies Find Boot Camps Have High Rearrest Rates.", February 18, 1998
Cowles et al. "Boot Camp" Drug Treatment and Aftercare Intervention: An Evaluation Review. (Washington: National Institute of Justice, July 1995).
Jones, P. Young Offenders and the Law. (North York: Captus Press, 1994).
Mackenzie et al. "Boot Camp Prisons and Recidivism in Eight States." Canadian Journal of Criminology (1995), Vol. 3, No. 3: 327-355.
McNaught, A. Boot Camps. (Toronto: Legislative Research Service, December 1995).

External links 
 Boot camps at Project NoSpank

Punishments
Penology
Penal system in the United States
Penal system in Canada
Youth detention centers